National Route 3 is a national highway in South Korea connects Namhae to Chosan. Due to the separation of Korean peninsula, it de facto ends in Cheorwon by now. It was established on 31 August 1971.

Main stopovers

South Korea section
South Gyeongsang Province
 Namhae County - Sacheon - Jinju - Sancheong County - Hamyang County - Geochang County
North Gyeongsang Province
 Gimcheon - Sangju - Mungyeong - Sangju - Mungyeong
North Chungcheong Province
 Goesan County - Chungju - Eumseong County
Gyeonggi Province
 Icheon - Yeoju - Icheon - Gwangju - Seongnam
Seoul
 Songpa District - Jamsil Bridge - Gwangjin District - Jungnang District - Nowon District - Dobong District
Gyeonggi Province
 Uijeongbu - Yangju - Dongducheon - Yeoncheon County
Gangwon Province
 Cheorwon County

North Korea section
Kangwon Province
 Pyonggang County - Ichon County
Hwanghae Province
 Singye County - Koksan County
South Pyongan Province
 Yangdok County - Maengsan County - Nyongwon County
North Pyongan Province
 Huichon - Chosan County

Major intersections

 (■): Motorway
IS: Intersection, IC: Interchange

South Gyeongsang Province

North Gyeongsang Province

North Chungcheong Province

Gyeonggi Province (South Seoul)

Seoul

Gyeonggi Province (North Seoul)

Gangwon Province

References

3
Roads in South Gyeongsang
Roads in North Gyeongsang
Roads in North Chungcheong
Roads in Gyeonggi
Roads in Seoul